Secondo may refer to:

Secondo, a term for the children of immigrants
secondo, the second course of the Italian meal structure
secondo, the second part of a Piano four hands duet
 "Secondo" (Hannibal)